The Nagpur–Secunderabad line is a railway line connecting  and Secunderabad. A major portion of this  track, from Nagpur to Kazipet, is part of the Delhi–Chennai line. It is also part of the Delhi–Hyderabad line. The line is under the jurisdiction of Central Railway and South-Central Railway.

History
With the completion of the Kazipet–Ballarshah link in 1929, Chennai was directly linked to Delhi.

The Wadi–Secunderabad line was built in 1874 with financing by the Nizam of Hyderabad. It later became part of Nizam's Guaranteed State Railway. In 1889, the main line of the Nizam's Guaranteed State Railway was extended to Vijayawada, then known as Bezwada.

As of 1909, "From Wadi on the Great Indian Peninsula Railway, the Nizam's Guaranteed State Railway runs east to Warangal and then south-east towards Bezwada on the East Coast section of the Madras Railway."

Electrification
The Kazipet–Ramagundam sector was electrified in 1987–88, the Ramagundam–Balharshah–Nagpur sector in 1988–89, the Kazipet–Secunderabad sector in 1991–93 and Majri–Rajpur sector in 1994–95.

Speed limits
The Delhi–Chennai Central line (Grand Trunk route) is classified as a "Group A" line which can take speeds up to 160 km/h.

The Wadi–Secunderabad–Kazipet line is classified as "Group B" line and can take speeds up to 130 km/h.

Passenger movement

Sheds and workshops
Ajni has an electric loco shed and a diesel trip shed. It is primarily a freight shed with around 190 locos. It houses WAG-7, WAG-9, WAG-9I, and WAP-7 locos. Kazipet diesel loco shed houses WDM-2, WDM-3A, WDG-3A and WDG-4 locos. Opened in 2006, Kazipet electric loco shed houses 150+ WAG-7 locos. Maula Ali has a shed for diesel locomotives and EMUs. It houses WDM-2, WDM-3A, WDG-3A, DHMUs (3-car and 6-car) and EMUs. Hyderabad has an electric trip shed.

Nagpur has a coach maintenance workshop. Ajni has goods wagon repair facility.

References

External links
 Trains at Balharshah
 Trains at Kazipet
 Trains at Secunderabad
  Trains at Majri
 Trains at Mudkhed

5 ft 6 in gauge railways in India
Rail transport in Telangana
Rail transport in Maharashtra
Railway lines opened in 1929

Transport in Nagpur
Transport in Secunderabad